Prince Ferdynand Fryderyk Radziwiłł (1834 in Berlin – 1926 in Rome) was a Polish nobleman and Polish-German politician. 

He was the son of Bogusław Fryderyk Radziwiłł and Countess Leontyna von Clary und Aldringen. Through his paternal grandmother, Princess Louise of Prussia, he was a cousin of the German Emperors. At the time Poland was partitioned, he lived in the German Empire, where he was a member of the German parliament (Reichstag) from 1874 to 1919. He was known as an important leader of the Polish minority and opponent of the Germanization and Kulturkampf policies. After Poland regained independence in 1918, he became a Polish citizen and a member of the Polish parliament (Sejm).

Son of: Bogusław Fryderyk Radziwiłł. Father of: Janusz Franciszek Radziwiłł, Michał Radziwiłł Rudy, Karol Ferdynand  Radziwiłł, Małgorzata.

Ancestry

1834 births
1926 deaths
Politicians from Berlin
People from the Province of Brandenburg
Ferdynand
Polish Party politicians
Members of the 2nd Reichstag of the German Empire
Members of the 3rd Reichstag of the German Empire
Members of the 4th Reichstag of the German Empire
Members of the 5th Reichstag of the German Empire
Members of the 6th Reichstag of the German Empire
Members of the 7th Reichstag of the German Empire
Members of the 8th Reichstag of the German Empire
Members of the 9th Reichstag of the German Empire
Members of the 10th Reichstag of the German Empire
Members of the 11th Reichstag of the German Empire
Members of the 12th Reichstag of the German Empire
Members of the 13th Reichstag of the German Empire
Members of the Prussian House of Lords
Members of the Legislative Sejm of the Second Polish Republic
Polish deputies to the Reichstag in Berlin